Shook may refer to:

People with the surname
 Al Shook (1899–1984), American football player
 Barbara Ingalls Shook (1938-2008), American philanthropist
 Edwin M. Shook (1911-2000) Maya archaeologist
 Fred Shook (1919-1992), American football player
 Kerry Shook (born 1962), senior pastor of Fellowship of The Woodlands
 Travis Shook (born 1969), jazz pianist

Music
"Shook", a song by Shawn Desman from the 2002 album Shawn Desman
"Shook (The Answer)", a song by Keshia Chanté from the 2004 album Keshia Chanté
"Shook", a 2020 song by Tkay Maidza
"Shook", a 2022 song by Meghan Trainor from Takin' It Back

Other uses
 Shook (magazine)
 Shook, Missouri, U.S.
 Shooks, Minnesota, U.S.
 Shooks Township, Beltrami County, Minnesota, U.S.

See also
 All Shook Up (disambiguation)
 
 Shake (disambiguation)
 Shaked (surname)
 Shaken (disambiguation)
 Shaker (disambiguation)
 Shakes (disambiguation)